Giuseppe Henry "Pino" Palladino (born 17 October 1957) is a Welsh musician, songwriter, and record producer. A prolific session bassist, he has played bass for acts such as The Who, the John Mayer Trio, Nine Inch Nails, Gary Numan, Jeff Beck and D'Angelo.

Early life 
The son of a Welsh mother and Italian father (from Campobasso), Giuseppe Henry Palladino was born in Cardiff on 17 October 1957. He attended a Catholic school. He began playing guitar at age 14 and bass guitar at 17. He bought his first fretless bass one year later, playing mostly R&B, funk and reggae with a rock and roll backbeat.

Career
Palladino was drawn to Motown and jazz at an early age, and took classical guitar lessons. He liked Led Zeppelin and Yes and started a rock band.

In 1982, Palladino recorded with Gary Numan on the album  I, Assassin. Following this, he was asked to contribute to Paul Young's debut album. Young's cover version of "Wherever I Lay My Hat (That's My Home)" by Marvin Gaye became a hit in Europe, and Palladino subsequently joined Young's band, the Royal family. He received offers to record with Joan Armatrading, Go West, and David Gilmour. He cites as early influences James Jamerson, Danny Thompson, and Norman Watt-Roy and also admires Jaco Pastorius, Stanley Clarke, Bootsy Collins, Larry Graham, Michael Henderson, Anthony Jackson, Marcus Miller, and Rocco Prestia.

In 1988/89, Pino played on the Don Henley album The End of the Innocence playing on three tracks including the single "New York Minute".

In 1991, he joined The Law with Paul Rodgers, formerly of Bad Company, and drummer Kenney Jones, who succeeded Keith Moon in The Who after Moon died, and recorded the album The Law.

In the 1990s, Palladino alternated between fretless bass and fretted and 4-string and 6-string bass. He played with Melissa Etheridge, Richard Wright, Elton John, and Eric Clapton.

He played on Mike Lindup's first solo album, Changes, with Dominic Miller on guitar and Manu Katché on drums.

In 1999, he began working with Richard Ashcroft of The Verve on Ashcroft's debut solo album, Alone With Everybody.

After The Who's bassist John Entwistle died the night before the start of their first tour in two years, Palladino became the band's bass guitarist on tour. In 2006, he joined the remaining band members on their first album in twenty-four years, Endless Wire. He played with The Who at the Super Bowl XLIV half-time show in 2010 with Simon Townshend on guitar, Zak Starkey on drums, and John "Rabbit" Bundrick on keyboards. In 2012, he toured with The Who on their Quadrophenia revival. He stopped touring with The Who in 2016, but is still occasionally involved in studio sessions, appearing on their 2019 album titled Who.

Palladino met Steve Jordan in the mid-1980s while both were working as session musicians, which blossomed into a friendship. Jordan credits Palladino's apparent ability to "feel" changes in music, through melodies, basslines, and an embrace of genres of nearly every kind. According to Jordan, he had planned to meet up with John Mayer and Willie Weeks in January 2005 to perform Tsunami Aid: A Concert of Hope for victims of the tsunami that struck southeast Asia. Weeks was unable to make the performance, and Jordan suggested Palladino, who had heard some of Mayer's work and was willing to come. Beginning a set that included the Jimi Hendrix song "Bold as Love", the three found a chemistry together. They recorded an album and toured as a trio. 

They released the album Try!, on 22 November 2005. The eleven-track live album includes cover versions of "Wait Until Tomorrow" by Jimi Hendrix and "I Got a Woman" by Ray Charles, two songs from Mayer's album Heavier Things, and new songs by Mayer. In addition, Mayer, Palladino, and Jordan are credited as songwriters on three songs: "Good Love Is on the Way", "Vultures", and "Try!". Palladino appeared on Mayer's third album Continuum, fourth album Battle Studies and seventh album The Search for Everything.

In March and April 2006, Palladino toured with Jeff Beck and played with J. J. Cale, and Eric Clapton on their 2006 album The Road to Escondido. In 2009, he formed a trio with keyboardist Philippe Saisse and Simon Phillips.

He played with Simon and Garfunkel on their Old Friends reunion tour.

In January 2011, he entered the studio with D'Angelo to finish recording Black Messiah.

In 2013, he played on the Nine Inch Nails album Hesitation Marks and was a member of the touring band. Additionally, he co-produced José James' album No Beginning No End (2013).

Technique and equipment
Palladino is noted for his use of the fretless bass on many albums. While it was typical for a bass in a commercial track to have a rather generic sound and stay "playing the low notes", Palladino preferred a different sound, combining fretless tone with an octaver effect, and basslines that frequently added chords, lead lines, and counter-melodies in the higher range of the instrument. Typical of this style was his playing on Paul Young's "Wherever I Lay My Hat". His equipment at that time included a fretless 1979 Music Man StingRay Bass and Boss octave pedal (OC-2).

From the 1990s onward, Palladino has leaned mainly towards a Fender Precision Bass. He used his 1963 Sunburst Fender Precision on Voodoo, using heavy gauge LaBella strings (tuned down to DGCF), a foam mute, and an Ampeg B-15 amplifier. He has also played Fender Jaguar Bass, Lakland Jazz Bass, and Larry Graham Signature JJ-4B Bass.

The Fender Pino Palladino Signature Precision Bass is modeled after two of Pino's Fender Precision Basses. The body features faded fiesta red paint over desert sand paint, based on Palladino's 1961 Precision Bass, while the neck shape and round-lam rosewood fretboard are based on his 1963 sunburst Precision Bass.

Personal life
In 1992, Pino married Marilyn "Maz" Roberts, a member of Paul Young's vocal group, the Fabulous Wealthy Tarts. They have three children: Fabiana, Giancarla, and Rocco, who are all involved in the music industry.

Discography

With David Knopfler
 1983 Release
 1985 Behind the Lines
 1987 Cut the Wire

With Don Henley
 1984 Building the Perfect Beast 
 1989 The End of the Innocence

With Go West
 1985 Go West 
 1987 Dancing on the Couch

With Elton John
 1985 Ice on Fire
 1992 The One

With John Mayer
 2005 Try! (as the John Mayer Trio)
 2006 Continuum
 2009 Battle Studies
 2017 The Search for Everything
 2021 Sob Rock

With Jeff Beck
 1999 Who Else!
 2006 Official Bootleg USA '06
 2010 Emotion & Commotion

With D'Angelo
 2000 Voodoo
 2014 Black Messiah

With The Gaddabouts
 2011 The Gaddabouts
 2012 Look Out Now!

With The Who
 2006 Endless Wire 
 2014 Quadrophenia Live in London
 2015 Live in Hyde Park
 2017 Live at the Isle of Wight 2004 Festival 
 2019 WHO

With Paul Young
 1983 No Parlez
 1985 The Secret of Association
 1986 Between Two Fires
 1990 Other Voices
 1993 The Crossing

With Eric Clapton
 1989 Journeyman
 1998 Pilgrim
 2001 Reptile
 2004 Me and Mr. Johnson
 2005 Back Home
 2006 The Road to Escondido (with J. J. Cale)

With Ed Sheeran
 2017 ÷
 2019 No. 6 Collaborations Project

With others
 1981 Jools Holland, Jools Holland and His Millionaires
 1982 Gary Numan, I, Assassin
 1983 Nick Heyward, North of a Miracle
 1984 David Gilmour, About Face
 1984 Jools Holland, Jools Holland Meets Rock 'A' Boogie Billy
 1985 Dream Academy The Dream Academy (various tracks)
 1985 Pete Townshend, White City: A Novel
 1986 Chris Eaton, Vision
 1986 Chris De Burgh, Into the Light
 1987 Pino Daniele, Bonne Soirée
 1988 Joan Armatrading, The Shouting Stage
 1989 Tears for Fears, The Seeds of Love
 1989 Phil Collins, ...But Seriously
 1989 Julia Fordham, Porcelain
 1990 The Christians, Colour
 1990 Joan Armatrading, Hearts and Flowers
 1990 Oleta Adams, Circle of One
 1990 Mike Lindup Changes
 1990 Claudio Baglioni Oltre
 1991 Julia Fordham, Swept
 1992 Peter Cetera, World Falling Down
 1993 Melissa Etheridge, Yes I Am
 1993 David Crosby, Thousand Roads
 1993 Michael McDonald, Blink of an Eye
 1994 Bryan Ferry, Mamouna
 1994 Carly Simon, Letters Never Sent
 1995 Oleta Adams, Moving On
 1995 Peter Cetera, One Clear Voice
 1996 Richard Wright, Broken China
 1996 Jimmy Nail, Crocodile Shoes II
 1996 Duncan Sheik, Duncan Sheik 
 1997 Steve Lukather, Luke
 1997 B.B. King, Deuces Wild
 1997 Garland Jeffreys, Wildlife Dictionary
 1998 Judie Tzuke, Secret Agent
 1998 Richie Sambora, Undiscovered Soul
 1999 Robbie McIntosh, Emotional Bends
 1999 Tina Turner, Twenty Four Seven
 1999 Beverley Craven, Mixed Emotions
 2000 Richard Ashcroft, Alone With Everybody
 2000 Gerry Rafferty, Another World
 2000 Erykah Badu, Mama's Gun
 2001 Nikka Costa, Everybody Got Their Something
 2001 Rod Stewart, Human
 2002 Ronan Keating, Destination
 2003 Edie Brickell, Volcano
 2004 Daniel Bedingfield, Second First Impression
 2005 Charlotte Church, Tissues and Issues
 2005 Will Young, Keep On
 2006 Paul Simon, Surprise
 2008 Amos Lee, Last Days at the Lodge
 2009 Gerry Rafferty, Life Goes On
 2010 Alain Clark, Colorblind
 2011 Robbie Robertson, How to Become Clairvoyant
 2011 Rebecca Ferguson, Heaven
 2011 Garland Jeffreys, The King of in Between
 2011 Adele, 21
 2011 Kelly Clarkson, Stronger
 2012 Mika, The Origin of Love
 2013 José James, No Beginning No End
 2013 Nine Inch Nails, Hesitation Marks
 2015 Keith Richards, Crosseyed Heart
 2015 The Corrs, White Light
 2016 Keith Urban, Ripcord
 2016 John Legend, Darkness and Light
 2016 Corinne Bailey Rae, The Heart Speaks in Whispers
 2018 Bahamas, Earthtones
 2018 José James, Lean on Me
 2018 Kimbra, Primal Heart
 2018 Josh Groban, Bridges
 2018 Chris Dave, Chris Dave and the Drumhedz
 2019 Jacob Collier, Djesse Vol. 2
 2019 Harry Styles, Fine Line
 2019 Rex Orange County, Pony
 2019 Emeli Sandé, Real Life
 2019 Robbie Robertson, Sinematic
 2021 Blake Mills, Notes with Attachments
 2022 Maggie Rogers, Surrender

References

External links

 

1957 births
Living people
Musicians from Cardiff
People from Finchley
Musicians from London
Welsh session musicians
Welsh bass guitarists
Welsh rock bass guitarists
Welsh people of Italian descent
Jazz fusion bass guitarists
John Mayer Trio members
The Who members
Verve Records artists
Atlantic Records artists
Male bass guitarists
Male guitarists
Welsh guitarists
Soulquarians members
The Law (English band) members
The Soultronics members